Otitoma kwandangensis is a species of sea snail, a marine gastropod mollusk in the family Pseudomelatomidae.

Description
The length of the shell attains 8½ mm, its diameter 3 mm.

(Original description) The strong shell has an elongately fusiform shape. It has a rather dark, uniform reddish-brown color. It contains 8 whorls, of which 3 form a smooth, red-brown protoconch. The whorls of the teleoconch are slightly convex, strongly lirate below the suture, with at first 2, lower on 3 strong spiral lirae on each whorl, 14 in number on the body whorl and 2 faint ones below subsutural liration, more or less visible on upper whorls.  The whorls are crossed by thick, rounded ribs, making the lirae slightly beaded, 9 in number on penultimate whorl, faint on last one, which has a very strong rib behind the peristome. Moreover, the shell is crossed by conspicuous growth lines. The aperture is oblong and angular above. The peristome is rather thin, with a conspicuous sinus above, then protracted towards the middle. The columellar margin 
is concave above, straight below, with a strong layer of enamel, a tubercle above at the sinus. The interior of the aperture smooth, red-brown with a bluish tint in its depth. The siphonal canal is straight and rather narrow.

Distribution
This marine species is endemic to Indonesia.

References

External links
 Kilburn R.N. (2004) The identities of Otitoma and Antimitra (Mollusca: Gastropoda: Conidae and Buccinidae). African Invertebrates, 45: 263-270
  Tucker, J.K. 2004 Catalog of recent and fossil turrids (Mollusca: Gastropoda). Zootaxa 682:1-1295.
 Gastropods.com: Otitoma kwandangensis

kwandangensis
Gastropods described in 1913